Regionalist National Party of the Centre (in Spanish: Partido Nacional Regionalista del Centro) was a political party in Peru.  It was founded by J. Calmet del Solar.

References 

Defunct political parties in Peru
Political parties with year of disestablishment missing
Political parties with year of establishment missing